The Authority for the Financing of the Infrastructure of Puerto Rico  (AFI)— is a government-owned corporation of Puerto Rico that grants administrative and financial assistance to other Puerto Rico government-owned corporations in order to develop facilities and improve the infrastructure of Puerto Rico.

References

External links
www.afi.pr.gov - official website 

Government-owned corporations of Puerto Rico
Government finances in Puerto Rico